JSC Kommunarka is one of the largest confectioneries in Minsk, Belarus.

History

Name 
The history of the Kommunarka factory began on February 15, 1905, when for the first time in the Minsk Treasury it received the trade certificate “The coffee shop with confectionery products, the bakery of confectionery products Georgy Vikentievich Rachkovsky”. It was known as "Rachkovsky's Coffee House and Bakery." In 1910 it was a pastry shop, and by 1914 it became “George's confectionary factory”. After the end of the Civil war the Minsk Labor Exchange created a labor collective of confectioners based on the former enterprise for the purpose of employment of unemployed people and called it “The first Belarusian confectionery factory”. In 1926 it was renamed to a confectionery factory “Progress”. In 1929 it was renamed Kommunarka. In honor of the 12th anniversary of the Great October Socialist Revolution, the factory was renamed into the Minsk confectionery factory Kommunarka. In 2008 it became OJSC Kommunarka.

Products 
  
 

Since the late 1950s, the management of the enterprise began to attach particular importance to the development of new recipes for confectionery products. In 1950s-1960s the factory began to produce varieties of candies and chocolate which later became classics:

 Chocolate Bottles (1957)
 Grilliaz (1959)
 Souffle (1960)
 Capital (1961)
 Loved Alyonka (1965)
 Little Red Riding Hood (1967)

Organization and ownership 
In 1994 the factory was reorganized as an Open Joint Stock Company. It was nationalized in 2012. The company has been allowed to use the "Natural Product" label.

Activity
Recently, up to 20 thousand tons of products of 187 names have been produced annually: chocolate, sweets, caramel, dragee. The volume of production in 2006 was 20,223 tons of products. According to Belgospischeprom, the Belarusian State Concern of Food Industry, output is 25 tons annually and includes 300 products including candy drops, caramels, chocolates, toffees, waffles, and other sweets.

The production is totally automated. Products are mostly produced from local raw materials; natural products and flavors are used.

A conflict with investors and nationalization

In 2012 there was a conflict between private investors and government officials. President Lukashenko accused investors of illegal privatization of the factory in 1994. Investors and the opposition press accused the president and government of illegally nationalizing of a successful company. In particular, the largest investor Marat Novikov called the president's actions illegal and violating the country's investment climate.

On August 1, 2012, the Supreme Economic Court received statements of claim from the State Property Committee against Kommunarka. On October 12, at a meeting on the issues of development of the confectionery industry, Lukashenko demanded to conduct investigation of the privatization procedure and the operation of the factory since Soviet times, and also demanded to liquidate the Supervisory Boards of Shareholders. On October 26, a new charter of the company was approved, according to which the state's share increased to 57%

References

1905 establishments
Food companies